False Dawn may refer to:

"False Dawn" (short story), by Rudyard Kipling
False Dawn (Parts One and Two) (The Forties), a 1924 novella by Edith Wharton about New York City in the 1840s
False Dawn: The Delusions of Global Capitalism, a 1998 book by John N. Gray
False Dawn, 1978 novel by Chelsea Quinn Yarbro
Zodiacal light, a faint, roughly triangular glow seen in the night sky